Ahamada is a Comorian surname. Notable people with the surname include:

Ali Ahamada (born 1991), French footballer
Feta Ahamada (born 1987), Comorian sprinter
Hassan Ahamada (born 1981), French footballer
Naouirou Ahamada (born 2002), French footballer
Saïd Ahamada (born 1972), French politician

Surnames of African origin